İsmail Hakan Demirel (born 7 May 1986) is a Turkish professional basketball player for İstanbul BB of the Turkish Basketball Super League (BSL). He is 1.91 m tall and plays the point guard position.

Career
He studied at Istanbul Bilgi University. He started his professional career with Tofaş in Turkish Basketball 2nd League. He was recruited to play for the Western Carolina University Catamounts, but the NCAA declared him permanently ineligible as a collegiate athlete because he played professional basketball in Turkey.

Demirel played his whole professional career in Turkey with the following clubs : Tofaş, Fenerbahçe, Erdemir, Darüşşafaka, Antalya BB, Royal Halı Gaziantep, Tofaş, Uşak Sportif, Trabzonspor B.K. and İstanbul BB.

National team career
With the junior national teams of Turkey, Demirel won the silver medal's at the 2004 FIBA Europe Under-18 Championship and at the 2006 FIBA Europe Under-20 Championship. He also won the bronze medal at the 2009 Mediterranean Games.

He was also member of the senior Turkish national basketball team at the 2006 FIBA World Championship and the EuroBasket 2007.

Career highlights
 2004 - Turkish 2nd Basketball League Championship
 2002 - MVP of Turkish 2nd Basketball League
 2004 - MVP of European Young Guards
 2004 - 2nd Place of European Championship
 2006 - 2nd Place of European Championship
 2006 - 6th Place of World Championship
 2007 - Turkish Basketball League Championship
 2007 - Turkish President's Cup Championship
 2007 - 10th best European young player
 2008 - Turkish Basketball League Championship

Turkish national team 
 2004 FIBA Europe Under-18 Championship:

References

External links
Euroleague Profile
FIBA Profile
TBLStat.net Profile

1986 births
Living people
Antalya Büyükşehir Belediyesi players
Competitors at the 2009 Mediterranean Games
Darüşşafaka Basketbol players
Fenerbahçe men's basketball players
Gaziantep Basketbol players
Istanbul Bilgi University alumni
İstanbul Büyükşehir Belediyespor basketball players
Mediterranean Games bronze medalists for Turkey
Tofaş S.K. players
Trabzonspor B.K. players
Turkish men's basketball players
Uşak Sportif players
2006 FIBA World Championship players
Mediterranean Games medalists in basketball
Point guards